Amioun is the capital of the predominantly Greek Orthodox Koura District (i.e. χώρα, "country" in Greek) in the north of Lebanon.

Etymology
The town of Amioun derives its name from the Aramaic language, meaning "'am Yawan" "place of the Greeks", with a possible alternative root fortified town with roman temples. Amioun is located on the top of an ancient hill dating back to before the 2nd millennium B.C., and the town was called "Amia" during this period.  The word Amia was cited in the letters of Tell el Amarna, which were sent in the 14th century B.C. by local governors to their overlords, the pharaohs of Egypt. In his etymological study of the names of Lebanon's towns and villages, historian Anis Freiha asserted that Amia is in turn derived from the Semitic word emun, meaning "invincible fort".

Demographics 

Amioun has a population of 10,658. Almost all the residents are followers of the Greek Orthodox Church of Antioch. Amioun is the largest  Greek Orthodox town in Lebanon, and 4th-largest in all of the Levant after Mhardeh, Al-Suqaylabiyah and Kafr Buhum (all in Syria).

Religion 

Amioun has eleven Greek Orthodox churches: The Dormition of the Theotokos (Al Sayydeh), St. George el Dahleez, St. John al Sheer, St. Sergios and Bacchus, St. Barbara, St. Domitios, St. Marina, St. Phocas, St. Simon the Stylite, St. George Al-Kafr and Our Lady of Breastfeeding (Mar-Gala).

Education
There are three public and two private schools. There is a public library and a private hospital.

Geography 

Located in the heart of Northern Lebanon, Amioun is the administrative center of Koura District.

Situated between the sea and the mountains, on a chain of beautiful hills that stretch from east to west, Amioun has a distinctive location and a scenic view. Surrounding the hills on which Amioun is situated are olive fields in the north and vineyards, almond orchards, and olive trees in the south. Paved roads, including the Beirut-Cedars main highway, run through those hills. Long ago, when the houses that stretched on those hills were few, Amioun was called “the town of beautiful hills”. Amioun can be reached via the highway that passes through Byblos, Batroun, Chekka, and Kfarhazir. It can also be reached from Tripoli by way of Bohssas, Dahr-al-Ain, Aaba, and Bishmizzine.

Amioun is also known for its olive trees, which are possibly the oldest in the world, and high grade olive oil.

History

Amioun is a very old settlement whose history can be traced back to the Paleolithic period. This is supported by the number of small caves built in the old city's rocks. In the past years, a number of French and German orientalists – foremost of whom was the Frenchman Ernest Renan – visited it, studied its archaeological sites and wrote about them. The ancient Semitic peoples are thought to have arrived in the region around 4000 B.C.

In his book “The Monuments of Lebanon”, Father Lamens mentions a number of towns, one of which is “Amia” (p. 76). If this connection is correct, Amioun may be considered as the oldest town in the interior of Lebanon.

Amioun's past has left its mark on different historical periods, whether ancient, medieval, or modern. Some of its monuments can be traced back to a period when different pagan religions prevailed. With the advent of Christianity, the roman pagan temples in Amioun were eventually transformed into churches.

The town -when grew in huge importance during the centuries of the Roman Phoenicia- used to be the site of a Roman temple, which was later converted into a church, dedicated to Saint George (The remains of the temple platform are still visible under a medieval monastery).

Landmarks 

Saint George Cathedral: erected over a former roman temple at the highest populated spot of the town, as mentioned in a circular written by an instructor of history in the official Lebanese schools Choukrallah Al-Nabbout. (Fig. 1)
Saint John "al-sheer" church: Elevated on a rocky cliff over a number of vaults in the southeastern facade of the cliff. A Triple scene of a Crusaders church (1099–1100) panoramic over the 28 man-made crypts in the facade whose carbon-dating suggests 15,000–24,000 years of age.
The town of Amioun, is known being a site for the Battle of Amioun in 694 A.D. between the Byzantine troops, under the leadership of Murik and Murikian, and some followers of the Monothelite doctrine, as mentioned in the article below by Chedid Al-Azar''.

During the 20th century, major changes touched local population, which was based on agriculture, mainly olive, olive oil and soap production, and modify it into the highest educated society in Lebanon. This resulted in a huge percentage, almost 30%, of highly educated people, mainly in the medical domain.

Notable people
Georgio Makhlouta 
Nassim Nicholas Taleb (Famous essayist, scholar, statistician, former trader, and risk analyst)
Alex Azar U.S. Secretary of Health.
George N. Atiyeh
Salim Saadeh (ex-Member of the Lebanese Parliament)
Salim El Badawi  (first entrepreneur in koura district)
Caren Chammas
Jacques Nasser (former CEO of Ford Motor Company)
Jacobo Majluta Azar (former President of the Dominican Republic)
 Dr Naim N. Atiyeh (Educator, psychologist, international consultant, professor, dean of the School of Education, UNESCO)
Walid Azar, Philanthropist.

Location
The modern town of Amioun lies on an important archaeological tell. Of major interest are the churches of Mar Jurius (St. George), built on the cellar of a Roman temple, and Mar Fauqa, or St. Phocas, built by local architects during the Crusader period. The entire interior of St. Phocas is covered with Byzantine-style wall paintings of the 12th and 13th centuries. A third church is the modern red-roofed Mar Youhanna (St. John) perched on a rocky cliff with tomb openings on its southeastern facade.
Near the old town government building, or "Serail," is the Chapel of Marina, an ancient burial vault converted into a chapel.

Churches and monasteries
There are 13 places of Christian worship in Amioun, including churches and monasteries and shrines.

Cathedrals
Cathedral of Saint George el Dahleez (Greek Orthodox)

Churches
Church of Saint John al Sheer (Greek Orthodox)
Church of Al Sayydeh (Our Lady) (Greek Orthodox)
Church of Saint Sergios (Greek Orthodox)
Church of Saint Barbara (Greek Orthodox)
Church of Saint Domitios (Greek Orthodox)
Church of Saint Margaret of Antioch|Saint Marina (Greek Orthodox)
Church of Saint Phocas (Greek Orthodox)
Church of Saint Gala (Our Lady) (Greek Orthodox)
Church of Simon the Zealot (Greek Orthodox)

Monasteries
Monastery of Saint George Al-Kafer (Greek Orthodox), built over former roman temple

Shrines
Cave of Saint Marina (Greek Orthodox)
Sacred place of Saint George (Demolished Greek Orthodox Church)

Twin towns and sister cities

Amioun is twinned with:
  Kalamata, Peloponnese, Greece.

Additional information

See also
List of cities in Lebanon
Eastern Orthodox Christianity in Lebanon
Greek Orthodox Church of Antioch
University of Balamand

References

External links

Additional pictures:

Additional references:
[https://web.archive.org/web/20070929101210/http://www.amioun.org/ eNET   ITing People...   http://www.enet-lb.com/   
All Rights Reserved.] Official site

Additional geographical information:
 Amioun, Localiban 
redirect to /world/LE/09/Amioun.html
 Amioun Municipality, Lebanon
 Lebanon Atlas - Amioun City: Tourism in Lebanon, Lebanon Touristic Sites, Capital of Al Koura

Populated places in the North Governorate
Koura District
Eastern Orthodox Christian communities in Lebanon
Archaeological sites in Lebanon
Amarna letters locations
Phoenician cities
Coloniae (Roman)
Roman sites in Lebanon